= Edward Irigha Brigidi =

Nigerian politician

Edward Irigha Brigidi is a Nigerian politician. He currently serves as a representative of the Nembe Constituency in the Bayelsa State House of Assembly, under the platform of the All Progressives Congress (APC).
